Max Heral (22 September 1926 – 26 April 2003) was a French weightlifter. He competed at the 1948 Summer Olympics and the 1952 Summer Olympics.

References

1926 births
2003 deaths
French male weightlifters
Olympic weightlifters of France
Weightlifters at the 1948 Summer Olympics
Weightlifters at the 1952 Summer Olympics
Sportspeople from Montpellier
World Weightlifting Championships medalists
20th-century French people